Bulačani is a village in the municipality of Gazi Baba, North Macedonia.

History
According to the 1467-68 Ottoman defter, Bulačani appears as being inhabited by an Albanian population. Due to Slavicisation, some families had a mixed Slav-Albanian anthroponomy - usually a Slavic first name and an Albanian last name or last names with Albanian patronyms and Slavic suffixes.

Demographics
According to the 2021 census, the village had a total of 1,147 inhabitants. Ethnic groups in the village include:
Macedonians 1,015
Persons for whom data are taken from administrative sources 115
Albanians 11
Serbs 4
Romani 1
Bosniaks 1

References

Villages in Gazi Baba Municipality